Consuelo Villalón Alemán (24 May 1907 – 8 November 1998) was a well-known Mexican pianist during the 20th century. She is remembered for her professional interpretation of Frédéric Chopin's music.

Early life

Born in Monterrey, Nuevo León, Villalón moved at the age of 8 with her family to Mexico City (Distrito Federal). There she started professional piano lessons with composer Manuel M. Ponce. At the age of 9 she began teaching piano.

The genius
Although the name of Manual M Ponce gave her some reputation later in her curriculum, in fact the moment of the development of her genius was with Luis Moctezuma.
She took piano lessons with him in his Academy and later in at Escuela Nacional de Musica (UNAM).
She was very different of her professor, who was a nervous person in front of the public. Consuelo Villalon in concert was a great pianist without fear of the piano; at one time she was called "The Mexican Rubinstein" in honor to Arthur Rubinstein.

Teaching career

As a teenager she started taking classes with Professor Luis Moctezuma, then head of the Piano Department at the Escuela Nacional de Música, UNAM. In 1952 Villalón assumed his position upon his recommendation. She also taught privately until the age of 89.

She died at the age of 91, in Mexico City.
Francisco José Beyer Bustos

Method
She taught the basics as Luis Montezuma wrote in his book "El arte de tocar el Piano", although, she added more ways in technical pianistic teaching. The main books she used to use were: Stamatti. Hanon. Lebert & Stark (four books).

1907 births
1998 deaths
Mexican classical pianists
Mexican women pianists
Mexican classical musicians
Musicians from Monterrey
20th-century classical pianists
Women classical pianists
20th-century women pianists